In the theory of general relativity, linearized gravity is the application of perturbation theory to the metric tensor that describes the geometry of spacetime. As a consequence, linearized gravity is an effective method for modeling the effects of gravity when the gravitational field is weak. The usage of linearized gravity is integral to the study of gravitational waves and weak-field gravitational lensing.

Weak-field approximation
The Einstein field equation (EFE) describing the geometry of spacetime is given as (using natural units)

Although succinct when written out using Einstein notation, hidden within the Ricci tensor and Ricci scalar are exceptionally nonlinear dependencies on the metric which render the prospect of finding exact solutions impractical in most systems. However, when describing particular systems for which the curvature of spacetime is small (meaning that terms in the EFE that are quadratic in  do not significantly contribute to the equations of motion), one can model the solution of the field equations as being the Minkowski metric  plus a small perturbation term . In other words:

In this regime, substituting the general metric  for this perturbative approximation results in a simplified expression for the Ricci tensor:

Together with the Ricci scalar,

the left side of the field equation reduces to

Gauge invariance
The process of decomposing the general spacetime  into the Minkowski metric plus a perturbation term is not unique. In order to capture this phenomenon, the application of gauge symmetry is introduced.

Gauge symmetries are a mathematical device for describing a system that does not change when the underlying coordinate system is "shifted" by an infinitesimal amount. So although the perturbation metric  is not consistently defined between different coordinate systems, the overall system which it describes is.

To capture this formally, the non-uniqueness of the perturbation  is represented as being a consequence of the diverse collection of diffeomorphisms on spacetime that leave  sufficiently small. Therefore to continue, it is required that  be defined in terms of a general set of diffeomorphisms then select the subset of these that preserve the small scale that is required by the weak-field approximation. One may thus define  to denote an arbitrary diffeomorphism that maps the flat Minkowski spacetime to the more general spacetime represented by the metric .

The diffeomorphisms  may thus be chosen such that .

These new diffeomorphisms will be used to represent the coordinate transformations for "infinitesimal shifts" as discussed above.

Therefore, in the limit ,

where  is the Lie derivative along the vector field .

The Lie derivative works out to yield the final gauge transformation of the perturbation metric :

which precisely define the set of perturbation metrics that describe the same physical system. In other words, it characterizes the gauge symmetry of the linearized field equations.

Choice of gauge
By exploiting gauge invariance, certain properties of the perturbation metric can be guaranteed by choosing a suitable vector field .

Transverse gauge
To study how the perturbation  distorts measurements of length, it is useful to define the following spatial tensor:

(Note that the indices span only spatial components). Thus, by using , the spatial components of the perturbation can be decomposed as

where .

The tensor  is, by construction, traceless and is referred to as the strain since it represents the amount by which the perturbation stretches and contracts measurements of space. In the context of studying gravitational radiation, the strain is particularly useful when utilized with the transverse gauge.

then choosing the time component  to satisfy

After performing the gauge transformation using the formula in the previous section, the strain becomes spatially transverse:

with the additional property:

Synchronous gauge
The synchronous gauge simplifies the perturbation metric by requiring that the metric not distort measurements of time.

and requiring the spatial components to satisfy

Harmonic gauge
The harmonic gauge (also referred to as the Lorenz gauge) is selected whenever it is necessary to reduce the linearized field equations as much as possible. This can be done if the condition

is true. To achieve this,  is required to satisfy the relation

Consequently, by using the harmonic gauge, the Einstein tensor  reduces to

Therefore, by writing it in terms of a "trace-reversed" metric, the linearized field equations reduce to

Which can be solved exactly using the wave solutions that define gravitational radiation.

See also

Correspondence principle
Gravitoelectromagnetism
Lanczos tensor
Parameterized post-Newtonian formalism
Post-Newtonian expansion
Quasinormal mode

Notes

Further reading
 

Mathematical methods in general relativity
General relativity